Enju Kato ( Kato Enju; 10 June 1919 – 9 December 2021) was a Japanese bhikkhu and politician. An Independent, he served on the Okazaki City Council from 1967 to 1984.

References

1919 births
2021 deaths
Japanese Buddhist clergy
Politicians from Iwate Prefecture
Japanese centenarians
Men centenarians
20th-century Japanese politicians
Japanese municipal councilors